Silaki Island  is a heart-shaped island located in Bolinao, Pangasinan, Philippines. This 10-hectare islet has 89 households with 376 population. It is tagged as the "Giant Clam Capital of the Philippines" because of the shallow reef surrounding the island that is home to giant clams locally known as "Taklobo". Silaki Island's reefs serve as a giant clam nursery and hatchery managed by the Bolinao Marine Laboratory (BML) of the University of the Philippines Marine Science Institute (UPMSI).

References 

Islands of Pangasinan